SS Verona was a transatlantic ocean liner that was built in Ireland in 1908 for an Italian shipping line. She was a troop ship in the Italo-Turkish War of 1911–12 and in the First World War in 1917–18. In 1918 a German submarine sank her in the Mediterranean with great loss of life.

Building
In 1907 and 1908 shipyards in Scotland and Ireland built three sister ships for Italia Società di Navigazione a Vapore, also known as Italia Line.

Workman, Clark and Company in Belfast built the second and third sisters,  and Verona. Ancona was launched on 19 December 1907 and completed in February 1908. Verona was launched on 31 March 1908 and completed that May.

She had berths for 60 first class and 2,500 third class passengers. She had twin screws, each driven by a three-cylinder triple-expansion engine.

Verona was registered in Genoa. Her code letters were SRCT and her Italian official number was 388.

Service
On 19 June 1908 Verona began her maiden voyage from Genoa to Philadelphia via Naples and New York. In 1909 berths for 120 first class passengers were added. In August 1910 she was refitted to carry 60  first class and 120 second class passengers, plus migrants. On 25 August 1911 she left Genoa on her last transatlantic crossing for Italia Line. Thereafter the Italian government took her over as a troop ship for the Italo-Turkish War.

In 1913 Navigazione Generale Italiana (NGI) bought Verona. By then she was equipped for wireless telegraphy. Her call sign was originally MOV, but in 1914 it was changed to ITV.

NGI put her on a route between Genoa and New York via Naples and Palermo. She began her first voyage on the route from Genoa on 9 March 1913. She began her final civilian voyage from Genoa four years later on 4 March 1917. Thereafter the Italian government took her over as a troop ship for the First World War.

Loss
In May 1918 Verona left Genoa bound for Tripoli in Libya. She was carrying about 3,000 troops, most of whom were deserters being sent to a detention camp. On 11 May she called at Messina, and then a few miles out of port  torpedoed her. Verona sank within 25 minutes, with the loss of about 880 lives.

References

Bibliography

1908 ships
Maritime incidents in 1918
Ships built in Belfast
Ships sunk by German submarines in World War I
Steamships of Italy
Troop ships of Italy
World War I passenger ships of Italy
World War I shipwrecks in the Mediterranean Sea